Dewayne Cherrington is a former American football defensive tackle who played one season for the Seattle Seahawks.  He attended and played college football at Mississippi State University. He earned a Super Bowl ring as a member of the Seahawks in Super Bowl XLVIII. In the game, the Seahawks defeated the Denver Broncos by a score of 43–8.

References

External links
Ole Miss Rebels bio

1990 births
Living people
People from Gwinnett County, Georgia
Sportspeople from the Atlanta metropolitan area
Players of American football from Georgia (U.S. state)
American football defensive tackles
Ole Miss Rebels football players
Seattle Seahawks players